Cornelis van Aersens may refer to:

 Cornelis van Aarsens (1545-1627), a statesman in Holland
 Cornelis van Aerssen van Sommelsdijck (1637-1688), lord of Sommelsdijk, the first governor of Suriname